Boronia beeronensis is a plant in the citrus family Rutaceae and is endemic to the Beeron National Park in Queensland, Australia. It is an erect shrub with many hairy branches, narrow, simple leaves, and four-petalled flowers.

Description
The lower surface of the leaf is a much paler colour than the upper surface and the edges are turned down or rolled under. The eight stamens are hairy.

Taxonomy and naming
Boronia beeronensis was first formally described in 2003 by Marco F. Duretto and the description was published in the journal Muelleria. The specific epithet (beeronensis) refers to the national park in which this species appears to be endemic. The ending "-ensis" is a Latin suffix denoting place, locality or country.

Distribution and habitat
The Beeron boronia grows in woodland on a granite range in the Beeron National Park in Queensland, previously known as the Beeron Holding.

Conservation
Boronia beeronensis is classed as "least concern" under the Queensland Government Nature Conservation Act 1992.

References 

beeronensis
Flora of Queensland
Plants described in 2003
Taxa named by Marco Duretto